Giovanni Velluti (born January 20, 1969) is an Italian pianist, pupil of Rodolfo Caporali and Aldo Mantia.

He inherited from his teachers (who were pupils of A. Rendano e W. De Pachmann, respectively) such guidelines that descend directly from Chopin pianistic school.

He is at his best in repertoire of the Romantic era, notably the works of Liszt and Chopin and is also a keen interpreter of Moszkowski, Carl Tausig, Henselt, Grainger, Schulz-Evler and other less frequently performed fin du siècle virtuoso works. Giovanni Velluti has forged a distinguished international career as chamber musician and accompanist too.
Velluti has performed in the most important Italian concert halls and abroad and with many leading singers among whom are Daniela Barcellona, Andrea Bocelli, Gianfranco Cecchele, Kristian Johansson, Carlo Lepore, Marco Vinco.
Since 1993 he is the regular accompanist of Katia Ricciarelli.

External links 
 Official Website of Giovanni Velluti
 Giovanni Velluti plays Franz Liszt - Liebestraume
 Giovanni Velluti plays Moszkowski - Etincelles

Italian classical pianists
male classical pianists
Italian male pianists
Living people
1969 births
21st-century classical pianists
21st-century Italian male musicians
Musicians from Rome
Academic staff of Conservatorio Santa Cecilia